Chemnad  is a town in Kasaragod district in the Indian state of Kerala.

Demographics
As of 2011, it had a population of 14,323 people, of which 6,662 were male and 7,661 were female. 2,029 residents, or about 14.2% of the population, were at or below the age of 6. The census reported a total of 2,747 households in Chemnad.

References

Suburbs of Kasaragod